Lysova is a feminine surname. Notable people with the surname include:

 Mikhalina Lysova (born 1992), Russian skier and biathlete
 Tatyana Lysova (born 1968), Russian journalist and media manager

See also
Aleksei Lysov

Russian-language surnames